Aburto is a surname. Notable people with the surname include:

 Amador Campos Aburto (born 1951), Mexican politician
 Cristóbal Aburto (born 1975), Mexican judoka
 Fátima Aburto Baselga (born 1949), Spanish physician and politician
 Jeimmy Aburto (born 1994), Guatemalan model and beauty pageant titleholder
 Mario Aburto Martínez (born 1971), Mexican assassin
 Rafael Aburto (1913–2014), Spanish architect

References